Roman Lyubarsky (born July 16, 1980, Arzamas-16) is a Russian political figure and a deputy of the 8th State Duma. 

From 2008 to 2009, he was the chief specialist, deputy head, head of the party building department of the apparatus of the regional executive committee of the Nizhny Novgorod regional branch of the United Russia. From 2009 to 2012, Lyubarsky held the positions of the Deputy Head of the Party Building Department of the Department of Regional Work, Deputy Head of the Central Election Commission of the United Russia Party, Head of the Regional Work Department of the Party Central Election Commission. In 2012-2016, he worked in the apparatus of the plenipotentiary representative of the President of the Russian Federation in the Volga Federal District. From 2016 to 2019, Lyubarsky was the Minister of Internal Regional and Municipal Policy of the Nizhny Novgorod Oblast. Since September 2021, he has served as deputy of the 8th State Duma.

He is one of the members of the State Duma the United States Treasury sanctioned on 24 March 2022 in response to the 2022 Russian invasion of Ukraine.

References

1980 births
Living people
United Russia politicians
21st-century Russian politicians
Eighth convocation members of the State Duma (Russian Federation)
People from Sarov
Russian individuals subject to the U.S. Department of the Treasury sanctions